The Gentilly South-West River (in French: rivière Gentilly Sud-Ouest) is a tributary of the Gentilly River which flows on the south shore of the St. Lawrence River.

The Gentilly Sud-Ouest river flows in the territory of the municipality of Saint-Sylvère and the town of Bécancour, in the MRC of Bécancour Regional County Municipality, in the administrative region of Centre-du-Québec, in Québec, in Canada.

Geography 

The main neighboring hydrographic slopes of the Gentilly Sud-Ouest river are:
 north side: Gentilly River, St. Lawrence River;
 east side: Gentilly River;
 south side: Poulet stream, Bécancour River;
 west side: Grand-Saint-Louis River, Bécancour River.

The Gentilly Sud-Ouest river draws its source in an agricultural zone, from the confluence of two streams, in the eighth rang of Saint-Sylvère.

  to the southwest in an agricultural zone;
  north, to the sixth rang road;
  north, to the limit between Saint-Sylvère and Bécancour;
  north, to Chemin des Cerisiers;
  north to Chemin des Hêtres;
  north, to the road;
  north, winding up to Route des Ormes;
  north, winding up to Boulevard du Parc-Industriel;

The Sud-Ouest Gentilly River flows onto the west bank of the Gentilly River, in Bécancour.

Toponymy 

The toponym “rivière Gentilly Sud-Ouest” was made official on December 5, 1968, at the Commission de toponymie du Québec.

See also 
 List of rivers of Quebec

References 

Geography of Centre-du-Québec
Bécancour Regional County Municipality